One on One with Igan was a Philippine weekday morning radio show hosted by Arnold Clavio and Lala Roque aired over GMA Network flagship radio station, DZBB (Metro Manila). The program replaced Dobol A sa Dobol B when Clavio's co-host Ali Sotto migrated to Spain and transferred to Net 25. It became also a former segment of Unang Hirit on GMA Network.

Program segments
Gloria Watch
Starpok - Showbiz News
Jeng-Jeng
Metro Manila Hataw
Txt Pabaon

One on One: Walang Personalan

On January 4, 2021, One on One was revived and renamed as One on One: Walang Personalan. It is Originally hosted by Arnold Clavio and Rowena Salvacion after Ali Sotto moved to Net 25. The format of the show is the same as the original. Clavio and Connie Sison currently serve as the hosts.

Hosts
 Arnold Clavio (2021–present)
 Connie Sison (2021–present)
 Rowena Salvacion (substitute for Sison; 2021–present)
 Orly Trinidad (substitute for Clavio; 2021–present)
 Kathy San Gabriel (substitute for Sison; 2021–present)
 Joel Reyes Zobel (substitute for Clavio; 2021–present)
 Toni Aquino (substitute for Sison; 2023–present)

Program segments
Metro Manila Hataw
Tunay na Pangbayan Walang Personalan
Karaokray

See also
Dobol A sa Dobol B
GMA News and Public Affairs
Super Radyo DZBB

Philippine radio programs
2008 radio programme debuts
GMA Integrated News and Public Affairs shows